Hurricane Teddy was a large and powerful Cape Verde hurricane that was the fifth-largest Atlantic hurricane by diameter of gale-force winds recorded. Teddy produced large swells along the coast of the Eastern United States and Atlantic Canada in September 2020. The twentieth tropical depression, nineteenth named storm, eighth hurricane, and second major hurricane of the record-breaking 2020 Atlantic hurricane season, Teddy initially formed from a tropical depression that developed from a tropical wave on September 12. Initially, the depression's large size and moderate wind shear kept it from organizing, but it eventually intensified into Tropical Storm Teddy on September 14. After steadily intensifying for about a day, the storm rapidly became a Category 2 hurricane on September 16 before westerly wind shear caused a temporary pause in the intensification trend. It then rapidly intensified again on September 17 and became a Category 4 hurricane. Internal fluctuations and eyewall replacement cycles then caused the storm to fluctuate in intensity before it weakened some as it approached Bermuda. After passing east of the island as a Category 1 hurricane on September 21, Teddy restrengthened back to Category 2 strength due to baroclinic forcing. It weakened again to Category 1 strength the next day before becoming post-tropical as it approached Atlantic Canada early on September 23. The system weakened further as it moved northward across eastern Nova Scotia and then the Gulf of St. Lawrence, before being absorbed by a larger non-tropical low early on September 24, near eastern Labrador.

Tropical storm watches and warnings were issued for both Bermuda and Atlantic Canada in preparation for Teddy. Its large size and strength caused high waves and rip currents to impact areas hundreds of miles from its path, ranging from the Lesser and Greater Antilles to the East Coast of the United States and Atlantic Canada. Two people in Puerto Rico drowned from the strong waves while another drowned in New Jersey. Total damage is estimated to be at least $35 million.

Meteorological history

The National Hurricane Center (NHC) began to monitor a tropical wave over West Africa early on September 7. The wave moved over the Atlantic Ocean on September 10, accompanied by a large area of deep convection, and began to steadily organize, forming a broad low-pressure area over the following day.

Initially, the depression struggled to organize, due to its large size and moderate wind shear. After the shear decreased, the depression became better organized and became Tropical Storm Teddy near 00:00 UTC on September 14. It was the earliest-forming 19th tropical or subtropical storm on record in an Atlantic hurricane season, surpassing the old mark of October 4, set by the unnamed "Azores" subtropical storm in 2005. Teddy continued to intensify as it became better organized, with an eye beginning to form late on September 15. The storm continued to intensify, becoming a category 2 hurricane later that day. Some slight westerly wind shear briefly halted further intensification, but when it subsided, the storm began another period of rapid intensification early on September 17. On September 18, an eyewall replacement cycle caused the storm to weaken slightly to category 3; and the following day, an increase in southwesterly shear caused it to drop below major hurricane strength around 00:00 UTC on September 20. Teddy then moved over slightly cooler waters caused by upwelling from Hurricane Paulette, contributing to its weakening trend.

This interaction caused an increase in both the storm's maximum wind speed and size. Interaction with the trough also triggered the extratropical transition process; Teddy's wind field became more asymmetric, and the associated convection become less centralized.

The storm weakened as it moved northward across eastern Nova Scotia and then the Gulf of St. Lawrence, where it was absorbed by a larger non-tropical low early on September 24, near eastern Labrador. This low, fueled by Teddy's remnant energy, accelerated northward, before proceeding to make a counterclockwise loop over the Labrador Sea for the next couple of days, briefly strengthening back into a hurricane-force low, before weakening again. Afterward, it slowly drifted eastward, before being absorbed into another larger storm near Iceland on September 29.

Preparations and impact

Large swells were generated by the storm, which affected the Lesser Antilles, the East Coast of the United States, Bermuda, and Atlantic Canada. One buoy operated by the National Oceanic and Atmospheric Administration (NOAA) in the open northern Atlantic off the coast of Nova Scotia reported a wave height of  early on September 22. Waves reached  at another buoy just north of Teddy on the afternoon of September 22, with winds gusting near .

Bermuda
Tropical storm watches, which were later upgraded to warnings, were issued for Bermuda due to the impacts expected from Teddy. The Government of Bermuda shut down the island on September 21, closing all government services such as public transportation and schools. The L.F. Wade International Airport was closed during the storm, but reopened on September 22 after the storm passed. 220 homes lost power on the island, mainly in Hamilton and Pembroke parishes. Beach erosion was also reported.

United States

The National Weather Service warned of high winds and coastal flooding in eastern New England. A high wind warning was issued for Nantucket and coastal Plymouth County on September 22. In addition, a high surf advisory was issued for those areas and for Bristol County. A wind advisory was issued for other coastal communities on mainland Massachusetts. For all of Massachusetts, a Red Flag warning was issued, signaling that critical fire weather conditions were possible due dry weather and gusty winds. In North Carolina, a coastal flood warning was in effect for the Northern Outer Banks and Hatteras Island until September 21, but minor coastal flooding was forecasted by the National Weather Service until September 22. A coastal flood advisory was extended to for Pamlico, Southern Craven, Carteret and coastal Oslow counties as well as Ocracoke Island and Core Banks until the afternoon of September 22. The same advisory for Beaufort County and Tyrrell Counties expired early on September 22. A high surf advisory was issued and extended for beaches north of Cape Lookout until September 23.

On September 18, a man and a woman drowned in the waters off La Pocita Beach in Loíza, Puerto Rico due to the rip currents and churning waves that Teddy had caused in the north of the Lesser and Greater Antilles. Charleston, South Carolina, experienced high tides topping out at major flood stage for three straight days from September 19–21. This was the first time such an event had been documented for three days in a row in records dating to at least 1934. The city reported some flooding in its historical downtown district, along with some other areas near the coast. In North Carolina, coastal communities experienced beach erosion and coastal flooding. NC 12 was closed from September 20–22 due to persistent storm surge and sand being carried onto the road. In addition, more than 80 dunes were washed away at Cape Hatteras National Seashore. Rip currents along the eastern seaboard also led to a drowning near Point Pleasant Beach, New Jersey. In Maine, very large waves pounded the coast, drawing onlookers and surfers. A fence was taken out by storm surge in Scarborough. Emergency officials were on standby across southern Maine in case flooding became a hazard. In Camp Ellis, the storm threatened to erode the shoreline. Some people in the town decided to put up storm shutters during the storm in case houses were flooded.

Canada

Tropical storm watches were issued as the storm approached Nova Scotia; these were later upgraded to warnings. Municipal sports fields, all-weather fields, tracks and baseball diamonds were closed on September 23 and all bookings were cancelled. School was also cancelled for many regions around the province. Halifax Transit stopped services during most of the storm, but resumed its services at 12:00 ADT (15:00 UTC) on September 23. Ferry service began immediately, while buses became fully operational an hour later. The Halifax Public Gardens reopened at the same time as Halifax Transit, but residents and tourists were asked to avoid visiting municipal parks until the storm passed due to safety concerns.

In Bedford, the Sackville River overtopped its banks, flooding a nearby park. Around 20,000 customers lost power across the province, but impacts in Nova Scotia were less than originally predicted.

See also

Tropical cyclones in 2020
List of Category 4 Atlantic hurricanes
List of Canada hurricanes
List of Bermuda hurricanes
Hurricane Gert (1999) – A hurricane that took an almost identical track.
Hurricane Juan (2003) – One of the most devastating hurricanes to affect Atlantic Canada.
Hurricane Bill (2009) – A storm of similar strength that also affected Atlantic Canada.
Hurricane Igor (2010) – Had a similar intensity and nearly identical track.
Hurricane Larry (2021) - Another long-lived Cape Verde hurricane which impacted Atlantic Canada.

References

External links

 NHC's archive on Hurricane Teddy
 National Hurricane Center website
 Bermuda Weather Service
 Hurricane Teddy hit Dominican Republic coasts - Sep. 23, 2020

Teddy
Teddy
Teddy
Teddy
2020 in Bermuda
Teddy